The following is the list of squads for each of the 16 teams competing in the 2014 FIBA World Championship for Women, held in Turkey between September 27 and October 5. Each team selected a squad of 12 players for the tournament.

Group A

Brazil
A 14-player roster was named on 25 July 2014. On 15 September 2014, a 13-player squad was published. The final roster was announced on 17 September 2014.

Czech Republic
The roster was announced on 12 September 2014.

Japan
The roster was announced on 15 August 2014.

Spain
A 13-player squad was named on 9 September 2014 and the final roster was announced on 22 September 2014.

Group B

Canada
The roster was announced on 15 September 2014.

France
The roster was announced on 10 September 2014.

Mozambique
A 19-player preliminary roster was announced on 3 July 2014 which was trimmed to 14 on 24 July 2014.

Turkey
A 17-player preliminary roster was announced on 28 May 2014 which was trimmed to 13 on 7 September 2014. The final roster was announced on 17 September 2014.

Group C

Australia
The squad was announced on 10 September 2014. Liz Cambage was ruled out due to a ruptured Achilles tendon on 21 September 2014.

Belarus
A 19-player preliminary roster was announced on 5 July 2014.

Cuba

Korea
The squad was announced on 21 July 2014. A final roster change was made on 19 September 2014.

Group D

Angola
A 20-player roster was named on 11 July 2014 and the final squad was announced on 19 September 2014.

China
The squad was announced on 20 September 2014.

Serbia
The squad was announced on 24 September 2014.

}

United States
On 13 January 2014 USA Basketball announced a 33-player pool from which the final 12-woman squad were determined for the 2014 World Championship. The roster was trimmed to 15 on 18 September 2014 before a 13-player list was released on 21 September 2014. On 23 September the final roster was announced.

References

Squads, 2014
FIBA Women's Basketball World Cup squads